Hacker II: The Doomsday Papers is computer game written by Steve Cartwright and published by Activision in 1986.  It is the sequel to the 1985 game Hacker.  Hacker II was released for the Amiga, Apple II, Apple IIGS, Amstrad CPC, Atari ST, Commodore 64, IBM PC, Macintosh, and ZX Spectrum.

Plot
Hacker II is more difficult and involved than the first game.  In Hacker II, the player is actually recruited based upon their (assumed) success with the activities in the original game. Once again, they are tasked with controlling a robot, this time to infiltrate a secure facility in order to retrieve documents known only as "The Doomsday Papers" from a well guarded vault to ensure the security of the United States.

Eventually, as they escape with the papers, the player is confronted by agents of the United States who reveal that they have actually been working for a former Magma employee, who wanted the papers in revenge for what had happened to the company the player had presumably exposed in the first game. The building that the player had unwittingly broken into was a government facility. The player then has to go back into the facility as part of a gambit to expose the Magma agent, avoiding the same security that had threatened the player before.

Gameplay

Gameplay is considerably changed from the previous game, and the packaging notably includes a "manual" describing the function of a four-way monitor system provided to the player. It is hooked into the camera security network of the facility the player is asked to infiltrate. A handful of robots are available, hidden in the facility, in case some are lost. By using the camera system and in-game map that helps track guard patrols and the location of the robots, the player must explore the one floor facility and find the codes needed to open the vault and escape with the papers. To aid the player there is also a pre-recorded security tape of a typical day for every camera in the facility, which the player can bypass the actual camera feed with when they need to be in an area for an extended time although care is needed to ensure the time stamp matches with the actual time of the game.

Discovery by the guards must be avoided at all costs because once alerted, they will call in a huge machine that resembles a large plate hung from what looks like a metal frame on wheels. This machine pursues the player's defenseless robot and attempt to crush it with the plate. The player can try to avoid the drone, although it is relentless in its pursuit and is much faster than the player's robot. If all the player's robots are destroyed, the game is over. Things that can set off the alarms include being seen by the patrolling guard who has constant line of sight in the corridors, having one of the cameras see the robot, incorrectly disabling the vault security or failing to sync a bypassed camera feed with actual time giving evidence there is tampering going on.

The game also featured escalating problems as part of the player's interface begins to fail, the in-game map starts to lose progress of the player's robot, monitored security cameras, the guard and eventually the map itself as the player defeated the system, eventually to get into the vault the player may well be forced to control the robot blindly relying on maps that should have been made by the player.

There are no saves available in the game, as in the first title.

Reception
Compute! described Hacker II as not having an original plot and criticized the inability to save, but favorably reported on the game's graphics, detail, and user interface. The magazine stated that it had "some of the most exciting and harrowing scenarios you'll find in a computer game" and advised, "I do not recommend it to anyone with a weak heart". Computer Gaming World praised Hacker IIs graphics and design on the Atari ST, and stated that the game more accurately depicted system cracking than Hacker, but cautioned that its difficulty and scale would not appeal to everyone. Info gave the Commodore 64 version four stars out of five, describing it as "a superior sequel to the original ... An engrossing and challenging espionage game".

Reviews
Isaac Asimov's Science Fiction Magazine v11 n5 (1987 05)

References

External links

1986 video games
Activision games
Amiga games
Amstrad CPC games
Apple II games
Apple IIGS games
Atari ST games
Commodore 64 games
Hacking video games
Classic Mac OS games
MSX games
Puzzle video games
Video game sequels
Video games about robots
ZX Spectrum games
Video games designed by Steve Cartwright
Video games developed in the United States